The Willing Muse is a short story by Willa Cather. It was first published in Century in August 1907 and immediately became a bestseller.

Plot summary
Kenneth is leaving the fictional town of Olympia, Ohio and moving to New York City with his bethrothed Bertha. Before leaving for Paris, his friend Philip warns Bertha that Kenneth may not like the hurly-burly that she is trying to impose on him. However, they do get married. Philip comes back sometime later; Bertha has become very successful, whilst Kenneth has stopped writing. Philip is then to go to China for work; Kenneth is sad to hear from Harrison that Olympia is not the quiet town that it used to be, and muses that China must be quiet. Later, as Philip is on his way back to New York from Canton, he reads a letter from Harrison saying Kenneth has disappeared. Back in America, he meets with Harrison and tells him he saw their friend in China. The two men vow not to say it to anybody and remain trustworthy to their friend, who evidently needed to get away.

Characters
Kenneth Gray, a writer. He has written two books, Charles de Montpensier and The Wood of Ronsard
Bertha Torrence, Kenneth's wife, a successful writer.
Harrison, a music critic. He went to college with Kenneth and Philip.
Philip, the narrator, a writer. He went to college with Kenneth and Harrison.

References

External links
Full Text at the Willa Cather Archive

1907 short stories
Short stories by Willa Cather
Works originally published in The Century Magazine